Ohad Kadousi is an Israeli professional footballer who plays for Hapoel Kfar Shalem.

Career
Kadousi began his career with Maccabi Petah Tikva F.C. where he played from age 8. In the 2004–05 season he got the chance to play with the senior team. After half a year, he signed with Maccabi Herzliya F.C. where he played in Liga Leumit. One year later he aroused the interest of Bnei Sakhnin F.C., which also played in the second tier of Israeli football. There he became the top scorer of the league with 22 goals. In this season he also led the team to the quarter-finals of the State Cup. After 2 years in Ligat Leumit he decided to go back to his home club Maccabi Petah Tikva. In the 2007–08 season he made 29 league appearances, but only made 18 starts. That season he disappointed, having scored only five goals. His team avoided relegation to the second division by only scoring more goals than Hapoel Kfar Saba F.C. On 25 June 2008, he signed a five-year contract with Ligat Leumit club Hapoel Be'er Sheva F.C.

In the summer of 2013 Kadousi joined FC Lausanne-Sport, his first club abroad, and will compete in the Swiss Super League after signing a two-year contract with the option for a third year if the club chooses.

In 2018 Kadousi joined Hapoel Ironi Baqa al-Gharbiyye F.C. in Liga Alef coming from Hapoel Hadera F.C.

On 26 June 2019 signed to Hapoel Kfar Shalem.

References

External links
 

1985 births
Living people
Israeli Jews
Israeli footballers
Israeli expatriate footballers
Association football forwards
Maccabi Petah Tikva F.C. players
Maccabi Herzliya F.C. players
Bnei Sakhnin F.C. players
Hapoel Be'er Sheva F.C. players
Hapoel Acre F.C. players
FC Lausanne-Sport players
Bnei Yehuda Tel Aviv F.C. players
Hapoel Rishon LeZion F.C. players
Hapoel Hadera F.C. players
Hapoel Ironi Baqa al-Gharbiyye F.C. players
Hapoel Kfar Shalem F.C. players
Hapoel Ashdod F.C. players
Israeli Premier League players
Liga Leumit players
Swiss Super League players
Expatriate footballers in Switzerland
Israeli expatriate sportspeople in Switzerland
Footballers from Petah Tikva